The Dutch Eerste Divisie in the 1989–90 season was contested by 19 teams. Schiedamse Voetbal Vereniging (SVV) won the championship.

New play-off system
From this year onwards, only one club promoted directly to the Eredivisie, instead of two. Also, one of the Eredivisie-clubs (the number 16 of 18) now had a chance to avert relegation. Promotion was no longer certain for the runner-up of the Eerste Divisie. A new and expanded play-off system was introduced. The following teams entered: 
Group round 
Six entrants would play in two groups of three teams.
 4 period champions (the best teams during each of the four quarters of the regular competition)
 2 best placed teams in the league (not being league or period champion)
The two group winners: play-off 1. Losers: remain in Eerste Divisie 
Play-off 1
 The two group winners from the group round.
Winners: promoted to the Eredivisie. Losers: play-off 2. 
Play-off 2
 The losers of play-off 1
 The numbers 16 from the Eredivisie (the numbers 17 and 18 already relegated directly)
Winners: Eredivisie. Losers: Eerste Divisie.

New entrants
Relegated from the 1988–89 Eredivisie
 PEC Zwolle
 Veendam
 VVV-Venlo

League standings

Promotion/relegation play-offs
The promotion/relegation play-offs consisted of three rounds. In the group round, four period winners (the best teams during each of the four quarters of the regular competition) and two (other) best placed teams in the league, played in two groups of three teams. The group winners would play in play-off 1. The winners of that play-off would be promoted to the Eredivisie, the loser had to take on the number 16 of the Eredivisie in play-off 2. These two teams played for the third and last position in the Eredivisie of next season.

Play-off 1

sc Heerenveen: promoted to Eredivisie 
FC Emmen: play-off 2

Play-off 2

NEC Nijmegen: remain in Eredivisie 
FC Emmen: remain in Eerste Divisie

See also
 1989–90 Eredivisie
 1989–90 KNVB Cup

References
Netherlands - List of final tables (RSSSF)

Eerste Divisie seasons
2
Neth